The Technical Image Press Association (TIPA) is an international, non-profit association advocating the interests of the photography and imaging magazine-publishing industry.

The association represents 30 titles, published in eight European countries and seven non-European countries.

History
The organization was established in 1991 as an association of European photography and imaging magazines. Since 2009, members have joined from outside of Europe.

Activities
Each year, the editors of the member magazines vote for the best products introduced to the market during the previous twelve months, taking into account innovation, cutting-edge technology, design, ease-of-use and the price to performance ratio of the products.

TIPA holds its awards ceremony every second year at photokina, a biennial trade fair for the photographic and imaging industries.

Member magazines

The member magazines that form TIPA are:

 Camera – Australia
 FHOX – Brazil
 Photo Life – Canada
 Photo Solution – Canada
 Chinese Photography – China
  – France
  – France
 digit! – Germany
 Foto Hits Magazin – Germany
 INPHO Imaging and Business – Germany
 Photo Presse – Germany
  – Germany
  – Germany
 Photo Business – Greece
 Photographos – Greece
 Fotó Magazin – Hungary
 Better Photography – India
 Fotografia Reflex – Italy
 FOTOgraphia – Italy
 Fotografie F+D – Netherlands
 Fotovisie – Netherlands
 P/f Professionele Fotografie – Netherlands
 PiX Magazine – South Africa
 FV / Foto-Vídeo Actualidad – Spain
 Digital Photo – United Kingdom
 Practical Photography – United Kingdom
 Professional Photo – United Kingdom
 pdn – United States
 Rangefinder – United States
 Shutterbug – United States

Affiliate member
 Camera Journal Press Club – Japan

Administration
TIPA is supported by a board of directors and a secretariat based in Madrid, Spain. The board is elected by members at a general meeting held every year.

See also

 Lists of magazines

References

Further reading

External links 
 , the association's official website

Arts and media trade groups
International journalism organizations
International trade organizations
International organisations based in Spain
Organisations based in Madrid
Organizations established in 1991
Photography organizations
Professional associations based in Spain
1991 establishments in Spain